Cold Hearts is a 1999 American horror-thriller film written and directed by Robert A. Masciantonio.  It stars Marisa Ryan, Robert Floyd, and Amy Jo Johnson.

Cast
 Marisa Ryan as Viktoria
 Robert Floyd as Seth
 Amy Jo Johnson as Alicia
 Christopher Wiehl as Charles
 Fred Norris as Uncle Joe
 Jon Huertas as Darius
 Christian Campbell as John Luke
 Dale Godboldo as Connor
 James Palmer as Duncan
 Greg Jackson as R.P.
 Robert A. Masciantonio as Kevin

Home video
The film has been released on VHS and DVD format.  The DVD was released in the US on October 8, 2002 by Synapse Films in a special edition version and an aspect ratio of 1.66:1, with extras including: Original Trailer, Feature Commentary by Robert A. Masciantonio, Original Audition Tapes, Jerks, and Photo slide show. It was released on DVD in the UK on March 6, 2000 by Bigben Interactive UK, in an aspect ratio of 1.33:1 and features no special features.

References

External links
 Cold Hearts at the Internet Movie Database
 Cold Hearts at Yahoo! Movies
 Cold Hearts at Film.com
 Cold Hearts at Rotten Tomatoes

Films directed by Robert A. Masciantonio
American horror films
1990s English-language films
1990s American films